The following is a list of notable people who were born, or have lived a significant portion of their lives, in the Lehigh Valley region of eastern Pennsylvania.

Authors, journalists, playwrights, and poets

 

Christian Bauman, novelist
Stephen Vincent Benét, former Pulitzer Prize-winning author and poet
Charles Bierbauer, former University of South Carolina dean and former CNN correspondent
Clair Blank, author, Beverly Gray series of books
John Birmelin, former Pennsylvania German language poet and playwright
Katherine Boehret, former Wall Street Journal technology journalist
Jen Bryant, poet and author
Russell Davenport, former publisher, writer, and former managing editor of Fortune magazine
Solomon DeLong (pen name Obediah Grouthomel), former Pennsylvania German newspaper columnist
Michael Flynn, science fiction author
Matthew Giobbi, author
H.D., former writer and modernist poet
Alfred Hassler, former journalist and author
Carmen Maria Machado, short story author and essayist
Randall Munroe, writer, XKCD comic series
Sandra Novack, novelist
Alix Olson, spoken word artist
Michael Pocalyko, business executive and financial novelist
Marci Shore, author and historian
Elsie Singmaster, former author
Jennifer Storm, author, Blackout Girl: Growing Up and Drying Out in America and Leave the Light On
Lauren Weisberger, author, The Devil Wears Prada

Business and politics
Roy Afflerbach, lobbyist and former Allentown mayor
William F. Andrews, former Florida State Representative 
James Soloman Biery, former member of Congress
Joseph Force Crater, former New York State Supreme Court justice
James B. Cunningham, former U.S. ambassador to Israel and Afghanistan
Charlie Dent, former member of Congress 
Charles L. Gerlach, former member of Congress
Fred Benjamin Gernerd, former member of Congress
Rick Glazier, former member of the North Carolina House of Representatives
Murray H. Goodman, former real estate developer
Eugene Grace, former industrialist and president of Bethlehem Steel
Erskine Hazard, co-founder of Lehigh Coal & Navigation Company, Lehigh Canal, and Lehigh Crane Iron Company
David W. Hess, member of New Hampshire House of Representatives
Lee Iacocca, former chairman of Chrysler
Michael Johns, healthcare executive and former White House presidential speechwriter
John Kline, former member of Congress 
Marcus C. L. Kline, former member of Congress
Fred Ewing Lewis, former member of Congress
Norton Lewis Lichtenwalner, former member of Congress
John E. McGlade, former chairman, chief executive officer and president of Air Products
Peter Newhard, former member of Congress
Andrew Horatio Reeder, former governor of Kansas
Donald L. Ritter, former member of Congress
James Ritter, former member, Pennsylvania House of Representatives
Charles M. Schwab, former president, Bethlehem Steel
Samuel Sitgreaves, former U.S. commissioner to Great Britain and former member of Congress
Richard A. Snelling, former governor of Vermont
George Taylor, founding father who signed Declaration of Independence
Josiah White, co-founder of Lehigh Coal & Navigation Company, Lehigh Canal, Lehigh Crane Iron Company, and other railroads
Charles A. Wikoff, most senior ranking U.S. Army officer killed in Spanish–American War
Susan Wild, member of Congress, Pennsylvania's 7th congressional district

Film, television, and stage
Lisa Ann, adult film actress
Alexandra Chando, actress, As the World Turns
Jack Coleman, television actor, Dynasty, Heroes, The Office, and Castle
Dane DeHaan, television and film actor, In Treatment, Chronicle, A Cure for Wellness, and Valerian and the City of a Thousand Planets
Devon, adult film actress
Omar Doom, actor, Inglourious Basterds
Oakes Fegley, actor, The Goldfinch
Jonathan Frakes, actor, Star Trek: The Next Generation
Mel Harris, actress, Thirtysomething
Althea Henley, former actress
Tim Heidecker, actor and comedian, Adult Swim's  Tim and Eric Awesome Show, Great Job!
Dwayne Johnson ("The Rock"), actor, former professional wrestler
Daniel Dae Kim, actor, Lost
Gelsey Kirkland, ballerina
Carson Kressley, fashion consultant, Bravo's Queer Eye
Christopher Lennertz, film, television, and video game music composer, Alvin and the Chipmunks and Supernatural
William Marchant, former playwright and screenwriter
Michael McDonald, costume designer and 2009 Tony Award and Drama Desk nominee for Hair
Kristen McMenamy, fashion model
Kate Micucci, actress, comedian, artist, and singer-songwriter
Lara Jill Miller, voice actress, The Life and Times of Juniper Lee
Aimee Mullins, model and actress
Robert Newhard, former cinematographer
Sally Jessy Raphael, former television talk show host
Daniel Roebuck, actor, Lost
Amanda Seyfried, model and actress, Mean Girls Big Love, Mama Mia!, and Les Misérables 
 Sheetal Sheth, actress, Looking for Comedy in the Muslim WorldGary Mark Smith, artist, author, and global street photographer
Dana Snyder, voice actor, Aqua Teen Hunger ForceSarah Strohmeyer, novelist and creator of Bubbles Yablonsky
Andrea Tantaros, political analyst and commentator
Christine Taylor, actress
Jonathan Taylor Thomas, actor, Home ImprovementDavid Zippel, Tony-award-winning lyricist, City of AngelsMusic
Rick Braun, smooth jazz trumpet player
Lillian Briggs, former rockabilly musician
Leon Carr, former Broadway composer and television advertising songwriter
Jimmy DeGrasso, heavy metal drummer, Ozzy Osbourne, Alice Cooper Band, Megadeth, Dokken, and Ratt
Walt Groller, Grammy-nominated polka musician
George Hrab, rock and funk musician
Keith Jarrett, jazz musician
Steve Kimock, rock musician
Ludwig Lenel, former organist and composer
Lil Peep, former rapper
Albertus L. Meyers, former music conductor, Allentown Band
Mulgrew Miller, jazz pianist
Farley Parkenfarker, keyboardist
Mike Portnoy, progressive metal drummer
Thom Schuyler, country music singer and songwriter
Shadow Gallery, progressive metal band
Melissa VanFleet, alternative metal singer, songwriter, and musician
Donald Voorhees, former Emmy-nominated orchestra conductor
Jordan White, rock musician
Stephanie Woodling, opera singer

Religion
Frank Buchman, former founder of the Oxford Group and the Moral Re-Armament religious movement
Tim Keller, Christian pastor in of Redeemer Presbyterian Church, author of The Reason for GodNathan Homer Knorr, former religious leader and 3rd president, Jehovah's Witnesses

Science
David Bader, Georgia Tech computer science professor
Michael Behe, biochemist at Lehigh University, advocate of intelligent design
James McKeen Cattell, first U.S. psychology professor
Richard Diehl, archaeologist, Mesoamericanist scholar
Edwin Drake, former oil driller
Terry Hart, former Space Shuttle astronaut
Francis March, former academic and founder of comparative linguistics
Aaron D. O'Connell, created the world's first quantum machine
Beth Shapiro, evolutionary biologist, MacArthur Fellow
Walter O. Snelling, former chemist and explosives expert who discovered propane

Sports
Collegiate sports
Chuck Amato, former head college football coach, North Carolina State
Steve Aponavicius, former placekicker and all-time Boston College Eagles football scoring leader
Parke H. Davis, former college football coach, Amherst, Lafayette, and Wisconsin

Major League Baseball (MLB)
Slim Emmerich, former professional baseball player, New York Giants
Bob Heffner, former professional baseball player, Boston Red Sox, California Angels, and Cleveland Indians
Gary Lavelle, former professional baseball player, Oakland Athletics, San Francisco Giants, and Toronto Blue Jays
Jeff Mutis, former professional baseball player, Cleveland Indians and Florida Marlins
Jimmie Schaffer, former professional baseball player, Chicago Cubs, Chicago White Sox, Cincinnati Reds, New York Mets, Philadelphia Phillies, and St. Louis Cardinals
Dave Schneck, former professional baseball player, New York Mets
Brian Schneider, former professional baseball player, Montreal Expos, New York Mets,  Philadelphia Phillies, and Washington Nationals
Curt Simmons, former professional baseball player, California Angels, Chicago Cubs, Philadelphia Phillies, and St. Louis Cardinals

National Basketball Association (NBA)
Pete Carril, former professional and collegiate basketball coach, Sacramento Kings and Princeton University
Tyrese Martin, professional basketball player, Atlanta Hawks
John Meister, former professional baseball player, New York Metropolitans
Brant Weidner, former professional basketball player, San Antonio Spurs
Bob Weiss, former professional basketball player, head coach of four NBA teams

National Football League (NFL)
Saquon Barkley, professional football player, New York Giants
Chuck Bednarik, former professional football player, Philadelphia Eagles, and 1967 Pro Football Hall of Fame member
Keith Dorney, former professional football player, Detroit Lions
Jahan Dotson, professional football player, Washington Commanders
Dan Koppen, former professional football player, Denver Broncos and New England Patriots
Noel LaMontagne, former professional football player, Cleveland Browns
Jonathan Linton, former professional football player, Buffalo Bills
Ed McCaffrey, former professional football player, Denver Broncos, New York Giants, and San Francisco 49ers
Joe Milinichik, former professional football player, Detroit Lions, Los Angeles Rams, and San Diego Chargers
Matt Millen, former professional football player, Oakland Raiders, San Francisco 49ers, and Washington Redskins, former president and general manager, Detroit Lions, and broadcaster on NFL on FoxAndre Reed, former professional football player, Buffalo Bills and Washington Redskins, and 2014 Pro Football Hall of Fame inductee
Larry Seiple, former professional football player, Miami Dolphins
John Spagnola, former professional football player, Green Bay Packers, Philadelphia Eagles, and Seattle Seahawks
Tony Stewart, professional football player, Oakland Raiders
Kevin White, former professional football player, Chicago Bears, New Orleans Saints, and San Francisco 49ers
Kyzir White, professional football player, Arizona Cardinals
Andre Williams, former professional football player, New York Giants
Joe Wolf, former professional football player, Arizona Cardinals
Walt Zirinsky, former professional football player who won 1945 national championship with Cleveland Rams

Olympic athletes
Thomas Litz, former figure skater, 1964 Winter Olympics
Kristen Maloney, former gymnastics medalist, 2000 Summer Olympics
Marty Nothstein, 2000 Summer Olympics gold medal winner, track cycling
Cheryl Van Kuren, former Olympic field hockey player
Bobby Weaver, 1984 Summer Olympics gold medal winner, freestyle wrestling
Cindy Werley, former 1996 Summer Olympics field hockey player

Professional boxing
Larry Holmes, former boxing heavyweight champion who fought under nickname "The Easton Assassin"

Professional golf
Jim Booros, former PGA Tour professional golfer

Professional racing
Jeff Andretti, former professional race car driver
John Andretti, former professional race car driver, NASCAR and IndyCar Series
Mario Andretti, former professional race car driver
Michael Andretti, professional racing team owner, former professional race car driver
Eddie Sachs, former United States Auto Club race car driver

Professional soccer
Francesco Caruso, former professional soccer player, Harrisburg City Islanders and Otago United
Jason Yeisley, former professional soccer player, Dallas FC

Professional tennis
Varvara Lepchenko, professional tennis player

World Wrestling Entertainment (WWE)
Afa Anoa'i Jr., former WWE professional wrestler known as Manu
Billy Kidman, former professional wrestler
Brian Knobbs, former professional wrestler
Jerry Sags, former professional wrestler

Others
Ian "Rocky" Butler, former professional football player, Canadian Football League
George Daniel, former commissioner, National Lacrosse League
Michelle M. Marciniak, former women's college basketball coach, South Carolina, and former professional basketball player, WNBA's Portland Fire and Seattle Storm
Billy Packer, former CBS Sports basketball analyst
Zach Rey, amateur wrestler who competed in the 2015 World Wrestling Championships
Ian Riccaboni, author, host of Ring of Honor Wrestling
Matt Riddle, professional UFC mixed martial fighter
Theo Tran, professional poker player
Dave Van Horne, former professional baseball broadcaster, Florida Marlins and Montreal Expos 
Dan Yochum, former professional football player, Montreal Alouettes and Edmonton Eskimos

Visual arts
John E. Berninger, former Pennsylvania impressionist landscape painter and first Allentown Art Museum curator
Karl Buesgen, former landscape painter and Pennsylvania impressionist
Mark Beyer, comic book artist
Chakaia Booker, sculptor
Don Dixon, astronomical artist
Peter Alfred Gross, former landscape painter
Ella Sophonisba Hergesheimer, illustrator, painter, and printmaker
Herman Leonard, former photographer noted for jazz portraits
Arlington Nelson Lindenmuth, former landscape and portrait painter and photographer
Antonio Salemme, former sculptor and painter
Grover Simcox, former illustrator
Gary Mark Smith, street photographer
Karl Stirner, former sculptor
Boris Vallejo, fantasy artist
Orlando Gray Wales, former landscape painter and Pennsylvania impressionist

Others
 Stephen Barrett, psychiatrist and webmaster, Quackwatch
Karen Bausman, architect
Thom Browne, fashion designer
Frank Reed Horton, founder of Alpha Phi Omega service fraternity
Sarah Knauss, supercentenarian recognized as the "world's oldest person" by Guinness World Records from April 16, 1998 until her death at age 119 in 1999
Harvey Miguel Robinson, serial killer
Ryo Tokita, artist

References

External links

"Famous People from the Lehigh Valley", The Morning Call'', August 18, 2006
"Lehigh Valley Pop Culture Connections" at Discover Lehigh Valley, January 2, 2023 

Lehigh Valley